The 2013–14 Hong Kong First Division League, officially named 2013–14 HKFA RedMR Hong Kong First Division League due to sponsorship reasons, is the 102nd season of the First Division League since its establishment. It will be a transition season before the new Premier League gets under way in autumn 2014. Therefore, this is also the last ever First Division that is the top division in the Hong Kong football league system.

South China are the defending champions, having won the First Division title in the previous season.

The season will start on 30 August 2013. League fixtures were announced on 14 August 2013.

On 11 February 2014, the Hong Kong Football Association concluded that Tuen Mun and Happy Valley failed to provide evidence to demonstrate that they are viable football clubs in terms of governance arrangements and financial sustainability. All of their remaining matches are suspended for the remainder of the season. Two days later, the HKFA announced that the results of all of the matches played by the two clubs this season will not be included in the league table. Goals scored in the matches will not be counted. However, where the matches have involved disciplinary sanctions, i.e. yellow cards and red cards, etc., these will remain on record.  Furthermore, HKFA has confirmed that none of the remaining 10 teams playing matches in the 1st Division will be relegated at the end of the 2013/14 season in the same report.

On 5 April 2014, Kitchee secured their sixth First Division title after they beat Sunray Cave JC Sun Hei and South China failed to take a win from Royal Southern.

Teams 
A total of 12 teams will contest the league, including nine sides from the 2012–13 season and three promoted from the 2012–13 Hong Kong Second Division League.

Stadia and locations 
Note: Table lists in alphabetical order.

Remarks :
1 As Siu Sai Wan Sports Ground will undergo renovation during the season, it will not be used for football matches within the construction period. Home matches of Happy Valley during the period will be played at Tai Po Sports Ground.
2 The capacity of Aberdeen Sports Ground is 9,000, but only the 4,000-seater main stand is opened for football matches.
3 The capacity of Tseung Kwan O Sports Ground is 3,500, but it can be expended to 5,000 if the temporary stand is opened.

Personnel and kits

Managerial changes

Foreign players
The number of foreign players is restricted to seven (including an Asian player) per team, with no more than five on pitch during matches.

League table

Positions by round

Results

Fixtures and results

Round 1

Round 2

Round 3

Round 4

Round 5

Round 6

Round 7

Round 8

Round 9

Round 10

Round 11

Round 12

Round 13

Round 14

Round 15

Round 16

Round 17

Round 18

Round 19

Round 20

Round 21

Round 22

Season statistics

Top scorers

Hat-tricks

The followings are not counted as matches involving Tuen Mun or Happy Valley are voided.

Notes

References

Hong Kong First Division League seasons
1
Hong Kong